The 2018–2022 Arab protests, known as Arab Spring 2.0 or Second Arab Spring, were a series of anti-government protests in several Arab countries, including Tunisia, Morocco, Jordan, Sudan, Algeria, Egypt, Iraq, Lebanon, Libya, Oman, and Syria. Economic protests also took place in the Gaza Strip.

The deadliest incident of civil unrest in Iraq since the fall of Saddam Hussein resulted in its Prime Minister being replaced. Sustained civil disobedience in Sudan resulted in the overthrow of president Omar al-Bashir in a military coup d'état, the Khartoum massacre, and the transfer of power from a military junta to a combined military–civilian Sovereignty Council that is legally committed to a 39-month transition to democracy.

The alternative names "Arab Spring 2.0", "Second Arab Spring", "New Arab Spring"  and "Arab Summer" refer to similarity with the preceding Arab Spring wave of pro-democracy protests which took place in 2010–2013.

Context and background

Tesbih Habbal and Muzna Hasnawi, Syrian editors writing in The Nation in October 2019, argued that the 2018–2019 sustained street protests in the Arab world starting with Sudan in December 2018, Algeria in February 2019, Egypt and Iraq in September and October 2019, Syria and Lebanon in October 2019, constituted a second wave of the process that started with the 2010–2011 Arab Spring. Syrian protestors in October held signs stating, "Syria—Egypt—Iraq: You've revived the spirit of the Arab people, from the [Atlantic] Ocean to the [Persian] Gulf!" Habbal and Hansawi described the process as having "profoundly changed the political consciousness of the region", overcoming fear of political activity and "setting a crucial precedent for challenging the persistence of authoritarianism". Habbal and Hansawi argued that the October protests in Syria "[proved] that even ruthless repression and tyranny cannot deter the resistance."

Habbal and Hansawi argued that the new wave of protests frequently included usage of the slogan "Al-shab yurid isqat al- nizam!" (The people want the fall of the regime!) used during the 2010–2011 Arab Spring. The protests have often been described as being inherently "anti-systemic" to the entirety of the political establishment instead of opposition to a single policy, fueling this is large scale unemployment specifically youth unemployment. As well as frustration towards many Arab government policies, reliance on international aid for basic necessities, corruption and reliance of hydrocarbons (fossil fuels) has all led to discontent towards the often cronyistic system of the middle east.

Timeline by country

Morocco 
Multiple demonstrations occurred in Morocco during this period, mainly stemming from issues existing since the Arab Spring. These issues at their core, while exacerbated by the death of Mouhcine Fikri, are due to the lack of a suitable standard of living for the "lower middle class and the poorest segments of society" in Morocco. Massive projects have been undertaken to improve infrastructure and development in the country, including a high-speed train running from Casablanca to Tangier, but young and poor people, many of whom reside in rural areas in the countryside, are unable to benefit from such projects and feel that their needs are still being ignored. Many in particular still suffer from the poor quality of transportation within major cities like the bus system in Casablanca, and connecting smaller cities and towns within Morocco. Most poorer Moroccans lack basic access to food and water and 22% of the country is unemployed. These recent projects have highlighted economic disparity and inequality between social classes in Morocco, which were further exacerbated by the impact of COVID-19, and have generated more social unrest among the poor. One recent protest started in late 2017 and continued into 2018 over the lack of food and water. During this period, a stampede occurred in Sidi Boulaalam, a small village outside Essaouira, when supplies arrived to a marketplace, resulting in the trampling and deaths of at least 15 people. The situation is worse in the country's interior in places like Zagora, a small village in Drâa-Tafilalet, where for years people have been surviving off drinking imported bottled water.

While the country was mainly spared from the violence seen in other Arab countries, it still occasionally sees protests over economic and social conditions. Methods of protesting against corruption and poor standards of living included singing political chants at soccer stadiums, with mostly young football fans gathering in the tens of thousands at Moroccan soccer club stadiums.

Most riots and civil unrest were a result of the 2016–2017 protests organized by the Hirak Rif Movement followed by a lack of reform on behalf of King Mohammed VI of Morocco. The aftermath of the Hirak Rif protests led to the imprisonment, detainment and trial of what is thought to be more than 400 protesters, journalists and political activists. In 2019, several activists were sentenced to 20 years in prison following a lengthy trial period, including Hirak Rif leader Nasser Zefzafi. The upholding of these sentences sparked outrage among the relatives of the accused and thousands protested in Rabat against their sentencing. In July 2019, the King granted royal pardon to 4,764 prisoners, including an unknown number of Hirak protesters.

In February 2021, protests in Fnideq against the closure of the borders with Ceuta and Melilla, which led to worsened socioeconomic conditions, were met with police repression, with authorities saying that the protests were "unauthorized" and "in violation" of the state of health emergency imposed in response to the COVID-19 pandemic.

In July 2021, local authorities in Sidi Bennour confiscated a food cart belonging to a 25-year-old man, Yassine Lekhmidi, as he wasn't wearing a face mask. Lekhmidi paid a fine, but the police did not return the cart. In protest, he self-immolated and eventually died of his injuries on 6 August. Lekhmidi's death led to demonstrations in Sidi Bennour which garnered nationwide attention, but otherwise failed to make any significant changes in the political landscape.

Anti-vaccine pass protests 
On 18 October 2021, the new government of Aziz Akhannouch announced that a COVID-19 vaccine pass would be mandatory effective 21 October to enter public facilities and enclosed locations including restaurants, cafes and shops, as well as for both international and domestic travel. While over 58% of the population had been vaccinated by this point, the decision still angered many in the working-class, as well as politicians including Nabila Mounib, head of the Unified Socialist Party (PSU), who refused to get vaccinated. The decision in particular to impose the pass requirement despite vaccination being only voluntary was also criticized.

By late October and early November, hundreds were demonstrating across the country against the vaccine pass. In Rabat, police dispersed around a hundred protesters planning to hold an "unauthorized rally", while an online petition criticizing the "arbitrary" introduction of the vaccine pass received thousands of signatures.

By December, most restaurants and shops had backtracked and no longer required a vaccine pass for access. A Qantara.de columnist noted that the mass protests made the Akhannouch government "the first in Morocco's history to clash with the public during its first few weeks in office".

Jordan

The 2018 Jordanian protests started as a general strike organized by more than 30 trade unions on 31 May 2018 after the government of Hani Mulki submitted a new tax law to Parliament. The bill followed IMF-backed austerity measures adopted by Mulki's government since 2016 that aimed to tackle Jordan's growing public debt. Although Jordan had been relatively unscathed from the violence that swept the region following the 2011 Arab Spring, its economy had taken a hit from the surrounding turmoil and from an influx of a large number of Syrian refugees into the country. Jordan also hosts a large contingent of Iraqi and Palestinian refugees, further straining its finances. The UNHCR places Jordan as the world's second largest host of refugees per capita.

The day following the strike on 31 May, the government raised fuel and electricity prices responding to an increase in international oil prices. This led to crowds of protesters pouring onto the 4th circle, in Amman, near the Prime Ministry's offices that night. Other Jordanians also gathered across the country in protest of the measure in unprecedented large numbers.  On 1 June King Abdullah intervened and ordered the freeze of the price hikes; the government acquiesced but said the decision would cost the treasury $20 million. The protests continued for four days until Mulki submitted his resignation to the King on 4 June, and Omar Razzaz, his Education Minister, became Prime Minister. Protests only ceased after Razzaz announced his intention of withdrawing the new tax bill.

The protests have not been led by traditional opposition groups like the Muslim Brotherhood or leftists, but by diverse crowds from the middle and poor classes. Although some protesters set aflame tires and blocked roads multiple nights, protests were largely peaceful and few casualties were reported. They were staged after daylight hours as it was during the month of Ramadan.

Tunisia

The 2018 Tunisian protests were a series of protests occurring throughout Tunisia. Beginning January 2018, protests erupted in multiple towns and cities across Tunisia over issues related to the cost of living and taxes. As of 9 January, the demonstrations had claimed at least one life, and revived worries about the fragile political situation in Tunisia.

The Popular Front, an alliance of leftist opposition parties, called for continued protests against the government's "unjust" austerity measures while Tunisian Prime Minister Youssef Chahed denounced the violence and called for calm, claiming that he and his government believe 2018 "would be the last difficult year for Tunisians".

A new series of protests started on 15 January 2021, amidst the 10th anniversary of the Tunisian Revolution. Thousands rioted in cities and towns across Tunisia, which saw looting, arson, as well as mass deployment of police and army in several cities and the arrests of hundreds of people.

After 7 months of discontinuous protests, on 25 July, President Kais Saied sacked the prime minister and froze the parliament which resulted in a political crisis.

Iraq

The 2018–2019 Iraqi protests over deteriorating economic conditions and state corruption started in July 2018 in Baghdad and other major Iraqi cities, mainly in the central and southern provinces. During the nationwide protests erupting in October 2019, Iraqi security forces killed over 500 people and over 27,000 have been injured, leading Iraq's president Barham Salih to call the actions of security forces "unacceptable." Some police have also been killed in the protests. The protests are the deadliest unrest in Iraq since the fall of Saddam Hussein, with the death toll reaching 511 by 2 January 2020  and 669 by 13 January 2020.

Algeria

The 2019 Algerian protests, also called Revolution of Smiles or Hirak Movement, began on 16 February 2019, ten days after Abdelaziz Bouteflika announced his candidacy for a fifth presidential term in a signed statement. These protests, without precedent since the Algerian Civil War, have been peaceful and led the military to insist on Bouteflika's immediate resignation, which took place on 2 April 2019. By early May, a significant number of power-brokers close to the deposed administration, including the former president's younger brother Saïd, had been arrested.

Egypt

The 2019 Egyptian protests consisted of protests by thousands of people in Cairo, Alexandria, Damietta and five other Egyptian cities starting on 20 and 21 September 2019 in which the protestors called for President of Egypt Abdel Fattah el-Sisi to be removed from power. Security forces responded with tear gas, rubber bullets and live bullets and,  arrests had been made, based on data from the Egyptian Center for Economic and Social Rights, the Egyptian Commission for Rights and Freedoms and the Arabic Network for Human Rights Information. Prominent arrestees included human rights lawyer Mahienour el-Massry, journalist and former leader of the Constitution Party Khaled Dawoud and two professors of political science at Cairo University, Hazem Hosny and Hassan Nafaa. The wave of arrests was the biggest in Egypt since Sisi formally became president in 2014. Human Rights Watch called for all those arrested for peacefully expressing their opinions to be released immediately. Amnesty International described the Sisi government being "shaken to its core" by 20–21 September protests and that the authorities had "launched a full-throttle clampdown to crush demonstrations and intimidate activists, journalists and others into silence". Two thousand people, including Sudanese Professionals Association (SPA) representatives, protested in Khartoum on 26 September in support of Waleed Abdelrahman Hassan, a Sudanese anti-Islamist student detained by Egyptian authorities, who gave a forced confession on MBC Masr television. The SPA stated, "the era when Sudanese citizens were humiliated inside or outside their country has gone and will never return". The Sudanese Foreign Ministry summoned the Egyptian ambassador and Waleed Abdelrahman Hassan was freed on 2 October 2019.

Gaza

The 2019 Gaza economic protests, dubbed as We Want to Live protests, began on February, initiating with the popular call "We want to live" by a group of politically unaffiliated media activists. The group has been nicknamed the 14 March movement. The protests aim at high costs of living and tax hikes in the Gaza Strip.  The protests were met with violence by the ruling Hamas, which dispatched security forces to disperse protesters. Several human rights organisations and political factions have denounced attacks on protesters by Hamas security forces. The protests were described as the most severe anti-regime protests in Gaza since the Hamas takeover in 2007.

Lebanon

The Lebanese protests were a series of protests that constitute a reaction against sectarian rule, stagnant economy, unemployment, endemic corruption in the public sector, legislation (such as banking secrecy) that is perceived to shield the ruling class from accountability. It is suspected that the direct trigger to the protests were due to the planned imposed taxes on gasoline, tobacco and online phone calls such as through WhatsApp, as protests started breaking out right after unanimous Cabinet approval of the WhatsApp taxes, due to be ratified by 22 October.

In contrast to the 2005 Cedar Revolution, and similarly to a process started in the 2015–2016 Lebanese protests, the 2019 protests were non-sectarian, crossing the Sunni–Shia Muslim sociological and religious divide and bypassing traditional political party alignments.

Oman 

The 2018–2019 Omani protests were nationwide protests and rallies in which tens of thousands of protesters marched against skyrocketing unemployment and inflation in the Sultanate of Oman. Over a 13-month period between January 2018 and January 2019, Omani citizens went out into the streets on several occasions to rally against decisions made by their government, whilst demanding more employment opportunities as well as economic reforms.

Protests erupted in Omani capital Muscat outside the Ministry of Manpower on 22 January 2018. Demonstrations spread rapidly across the country, reaching other major cities such as Salalah, Sohar and Sur. Numerous people were reportedly arrested. In response, the Omani government announced that it would create 25 thousand public service jobs to accommodate protesters’ demands.

At the end of 2018 and into January 2019, mass protests resurfaced in Oman. Thousands of protesters rallied against economic hardship and once again requested more job opportunities. Demonstrations were oppressed by riot police, causing dozens of people to be arrested. The demonstrations triggered a swift response by the Omani government. On 6 January, the Omani government announced that it would establish a new body to alleviate the employment-crisis. The so-called National Center for Employment was created to help Omanis to navigate the national labor market. As a result, protests and strikes came to an end on 9 January 2019.

Libya

Street protests took place in August and September 2020 over issues of poor provision of services in several cities in Libya, including both cities controlled by the Government of National Accord (GNA) in the west (Tripoli, Misrata, Zawiya) and by the Libyan National Army (LNA) in the east of Libya (Benghazi). The de facto LNA-associated government led by Abdullah al-Thani offered its resignation on 13 September 2020 in response to the protests.

Strikes against power cuts saw hundreds attend on 29-30 October. It was met with tear gas and plastic bullets and riots was met with rubber bullets. Riots occurred on 29 October by workers and ended violently with clashes. On 31 October 2020, Fayez al-Sarraj rescinded his decision to resign. Elections were scheduled to be held on 24 December 2021 but was postponed after the head of High National Election Commission (HNEC) ordered the dissolution of the electoral committees nationwide. Elections will now be held in June 2022.

Sudan

Revolution
The Sudanese Revolution was a major shift of political power in Sudan that started with street protests throughout Sudan on 19 December 2018 and continued with sustained civil disobedience for about eight months, during which the 2019 Sudanese coup d'état deposed President Omar al-Bashir after thirty years in power, Khartoum massacre took place under the leadership of the Transitional Military Council (TMC) that replaced al-Bashir, and in July and August 2019 the TMC and the Forces of Freedom and Change alliance (FFC) signed a Political Agreement and a Draft Constitutional Declaration legally defining a planned 39-month phase of transitional state institutions and procedures to return Sudan to a civilian democracy. In August and September 2019, the TMC formally transferred executive power to a mixed military–civilian collective head of state, the Sovereignty Council of Sudan, and to a civilian prime minister (Abdalla Hamdok) and a mostly civilian cabinet, while judicial power was transferred to Nemat Abdullah Khair, Sudan's first female Chief Justice.

Later protests
Late-2019 Sudanese protests – a continuation of street protests during the 39-month planned transitionary institution period

Syria
In southwest Syria in June 2020, worsening economic conditions led to rare anti-government protests in the city of Suweida, where demonstrators called for the removal of President Bashar al-Assad, as well as the withdrawal of Iran-backed militias and Russian troops from the region. The protests led to Assad dismissing Prime Minister Imad Khamis. In addition, counter-demonstrations in support of the Assad government were also held. Both Amnesty International and Human Rights Watch condemned the use of "arbitrary detentions", beatings and arrests by Syrian security forces, and called on the government to "immediately release" those detained.

Summary of conflicts by country

See also
 2019–2021 Algerian protests
 2021–2022 Tunisian political crisis
 2020s in political history
 Arab Revolt (disambiguation)
 Arab Spring
 Arab Winter
 Hirak Rif Movement
 2019 Sudanese coup d'état
 2019–2020 Iranian protests
 List of protests in the 21st century

References

 
2010s in Africa
2020s in Africa
2010s in Asia
2020s in Asia
2010s protests
2020s protests
Arab Winter
History of North Africa
History of the Middle East
Intifadas
Protest marches
Revolutionary waves